Coriaria ruscifolia is a plant of the  Coriariaceae family.

It is native to Mexico, Central America, and South America.

Description
Coriaria ruscifolia is a deciduous shrub . It is poisonous except for the "fruit", which are actually petals.

References

Coriariaceae
Flora of Central America
Flora of South America
Flora of Mexico
Taxa named by Carl Linnaeus